is a Japanese actress and former teen idol, modeling for hundreds of photo shoots. She is regarded as one of Japan's top actresses, and her accolades include six Japan Academy Film Prizes and three Kinema Junpo Awards

Miyazawa began her career as a child model, seeing wide exposure as the original face of Mitsui Rehouse, and made her acting debut in the 1988 film Seven Day's War, for which she won the Japan Academy Award for Newcomer of the Year at age sixteen. Her short-lived music career began with the single "Dream Rush" in 1989, and the next year she performed at the prestigious Kōhaku Uta Gassen television special.

Miyazawa quickly rose to prominence as one of the top idols of the early Heisei period, attracting controversy for her 1991 nude photography book Santa Fe, which moved 1.5 million copies. Her personal struggles were further scrutinized, including a high-profile engagement to sumo wrestler Takanohana, a suicide attempt and battle with anorexia nervosa. By 1996, she went into hiatus and briefly resettled in San Diego.

She took on a few television drama roles in the late 1990s, and returned to the big screen in the Taiwanese films The Cabbie (2000) and Peony Pavilion (2001). She co-starred in the highly-acclaimed 2002 film The Twilight Samurai, which marked a full-fledged comeback for Miyazawa and remains as her most recognizable role both domestically and internationally. She saw further success in The Face of Jizo and Tony Takitani (2004), and received several accolades for Pale Moon (2014) and Her Love Boils Bathwater (2016).

Life and career 
Miyazawa was born in Tokyo to a Dutch father and a Japanese mother.  Since her debut at age 11 in an advertisement for Kit Kat, she has appeared many films, television shows, commercials, stage appearances and photo books to her credit. She starred in the children's comedy Bokura no Nanokakan Sensō (Seven Days' War) and Tokyo Elevator Girl. Miyazawa made her debut as a singer on September 15, 1989, with her album MU.

Miyazawa gained notoriety in 1991 with the publication of a fine art nude photography book, Santa Fe, and even more publicity in 1992 with her engagement to sumo star Takanohana. The engagement was called off in 1993. In September 1994 she cut her wrists with a broken glass in what she described as an "accident". The tabloids focused on Miyazawa's drinking session, fights with her mother, and her escape to a nearby hotel as signs of a suicide attempt. Miyazawa continued to pursue her career as an actress, including a performance in Kon Ichikawa's movie 47 Ronin that year. But the following February she pulled out of the drama Kura and in November backed out of the musical Kyote.

In early 1996 Miyazawa moved to Coastal California, but by May she was back on TV reporting from the Cannes Film Festival and later that year she appeared in two TV dramas: Hanayome Kaizoebito and Kyosokyoku. In 1997 she made Mikeneko Homes (tasogare) Hoteru and also appeared on stage.

In 2001, Miyazawa won the Best Actress Award at the 23rd Moscow International Film Festival by portraying a Chinese Kunqu performer in the Hong Kong film Peony Pavilion, directed by Yonfan. Then in 2002, she starred alongside Hiroyuki Sanada in Tasogare Seibei (The Twilight Samurai), the year's hit movie that won numerous awards at home, including ones for the lead actors, and was nominated for an Academy Award as Best Foreign Language Film. In 2003 she played the role of Oshino in the NHK TV series Musashi.

Tony Takitani (2004) — an adaptation of a short story by the bestselling author Haruki Murakami — received critical acclaim, with Miyazawa playing two roles alongside Issey Ogata. The film, which was entered at the Sundance Film Festival, has been described as "a perfectly controlled minimalist film masterpiece". In 2005, she starred as Tsubaki in Ashurajō no Hitomi (あしゅらじょう の ひとみ), which is a movie adaptation of a 16th-century play.

Most recently, Miyazawa received the 40th Japan Academy Prize for Best Actress for her performance in Her Love Boils Bathwater.

Personal life
On February 13, 2009, Miyazawa announced to the public that she was six months pregnant and would soon marry the father of the child who is reported to be Hiroyuki Nakatsu, an ex-pro surfer from Hawaii turned entrepreneur. On May 20, 2009 in Tokyo she gave birth to a baby girl.

On March 23, 2016, Miyazawa announced that her divorce from Nakatsu has been finalized.

Filmography

Film
 Seven Days' War (1988) — Hitomi Nakayama
 Who Do I Choose? (1989)
 Basara: The Princess Goh (1992)
 Erotic Liaisons (1992)
 Kin chan no Cinema Jack II : Light of Firefly (1994)
 47 Ronin (1994)
 Tenshu monogatari (1995)
 The Cabbie (2000)
 Peony Pavilion (2001)
 Free and Easy 12: Big Holiday Bonus Project (2001)
 Utsutsu (2002)
 The Twilight Samurai (2002)
 The Face of Jizo (2004)
 Tony Takitani (2004)
 Ashurajō no Hitomi (2005)
 The Book of the Dead (2005)—Voice
 Hana (2006)
 The Invitation from Cinema Orion (2007)
 Dreaming Awake (2008)
 Haha Shan no Komoriuta (2009)
 Gelatin Silver Love (2009)
 Kiki's Delivery Service (2014)
 Pale Moon (2014) — Rika Umezawa
 Too Young to Die! (2016)
 Her Love Boils Bathwater (2016)
 No Longer Human (2019)
 Seven Days War (2019) — Hitomi Nakayama (voice)
 Independence of Japan (2020) — Masako Shirasu
 The Sunday Runoff (2022) — Yumi Kawashima
I Am Makimoto (2022) — Miharu Imae

Television
 Kasuga no Tsubone (1989) — young Ohatsu
 Taiheiki (1991) — Fujiyasha
 Tokyo Elevator Girl (1992)
 Kita no Kuni kara: Himitsu (1995)
 Concerto (1996)
 Kita no Kuni kara: Jidai (1998)
 Genroku Ryōran (1999) — Yōzen-in
 Kita no Kuni kara: Yuigon (2002)
 Gō (2011) — Yodo-dono
 Gu-Gu Datte Neko de Aru (2014)
 Sherlock Holmes (2014 puppetry in which she voices Irene Adler)
 North Light (2020) — Yukari Murakami
 The Naked Director Season 2 (2021) — Ms. Takamiya
 The 13 Lords of the Shogun (2022) — Lady Maki

Japanese dub
 The Hunchback of Notre Dame II (2002) — Madellaine
 Oceans (2009) — Narrator

Discography

Studio albums

Singles

Stage 
 Gypsy (1991)
 Kaijin Bessō (1994)
 Tenshu monogatari (1994, 1996)
 Furu-amerika ni Sode wa Nurasaji (1994)
 Tezuka's Ancestor Dr. Ryoan (1998)
 Rainbow Parakeet (2000)
 The Tale of Genji (2000)
 The Kiss of an Invisible Man (2004)
 Rope (2006–07)
 Dorakuru－God Fearing Dracul (2007)
 A Doll's House (2008)
 Piper (2009)
 The Character (2010)

Awards 
 A Doll's House
 Yomiuri Theater Award—Best Actress
 Rope
 The 41st Kinokuniya Stage Award—Individual Award
 Art Encouragement Prize for 2004—from Agency for Cultural Affairs
  The Face of Jizō
 Blue Ribbon Award—Best Actress
 Kinema Junpo Awards—Best Actress
 Yamaji Fumiko Award—Best Actress
  The Kiss of an Invisible Man
 Yomiuri Theater Award—Best Actress
  Twilight Samurai
 Japan Academy Award—Best Actress
 Blue Ribbon Award—Best Supporting Actress
 Nikkan Sports Movie Award—Best Actress
 Kinema Junpo Awards—Best Actress
 Mainichi Film Concours—Best Supporting Actress
 Hochi Film Award—Best Actress
 Utsutsu
 Kinema Junpo Awards—Best Actress
 Blue Ribbon Award—Best Supporting Actress
 Peony Pavilion
 Moscow International Film Festival—Best Actress
 Seven Days' War
 Japan Academy Award—Best New Actor
 Nikkan Sports Movie Award—Best New Talent
 Who Do I Choose?
 Nikkan Sports Film Award—Best New Talent

References

External links 

 Profile at Japan Zone
 
 Metropolis – Big in Japan: Rie Miyazawa
 Idol*80 Discography (in Japanese)
 

1973 births
Actresses from Tokyo
Japanese idols
Japanese female models
Japanese film actresses
Japanese people of Dutch descent
Japanese stage actresses
Japanese television actresses
Japanese voice actresses
Living people
People from Nerima
20th-century Japanese actresses
21st-century Japanese actresses